Cathleen Delany (21 July 1907 – 19 June 1997) was an Irish actress of stage and screen.

Life
Born Kathleen Mary Delany to journalist Alfred Delany and his wife, Kathleen Mary Kilgannon of 98 Marlboro Rd. in Dublin. She was professionally known as Cathleen Delany.

She was one of the principal players of the first decade of the Gate Theatre's existence. Considered a talented singer she began in local theatre with the Rathmines and Rathgar Musical Society. From there she auditioned for the Gate. She debuted on the Gate stage in The Agamemnon of Aeschylus in 1933. Delany worked with Hilton Edwards and Micheál Mac Liammóir during their London season in 1934 and in 1936 she went with them on their first tour of Egypt. When they returned she began touring Ireland with Longford Productions. She moved to the screen and performed in a wide variety of roles. Her last stage performance was in May, 1988 in the Gate in Brian Friel's adaptation of Fathers and Sons.

In the 1970s, Delany also started to work for film and television. She played the elderly Aunt Julia in  The Dead (1987), John Huston's adaption of the James Joyce short story. Her last role was in the television series Jake's Progress in 1995. 
 
Delany married John O'Dea, and raised her niece Hazel Roost from infancy. She died a month before her 90th birthday.

Performances

Screen 

 1972 A War of Children (TV film) -  Mrs. Doyle
 1978 Last of Summer (TV) -  Dotey Cregan
 1983 Attracta - Sarah Crookham
 1984 The Irish R.M. (TV) -  Louisa Butler-Know
 1987 The Dead - Aunt Julia
 1988 Brigit
 1988 Troubles (TV) -  Miss Rice
 1989 Ticket to Ride (TV) -  Mrs. Durkin
 1990 The Love She Sought (TV film) -  Mrs. Curry, the Bishop's Housekeeper
 1990 The Real Charlotte (TV) -  Mrs. Gascoine
 1991 The Miracle -Miss Strange
 1991 December Bride -Agnes the Midwife
 1993 The Snapper (TV) -  Oul'one
 1993 Lovejoy (TV) -  Old Lady
 1995 Jake's Progress (TV) -  Helen

Stage

 A Bride for the Unicorn
 Abdication
 Anything But the Truth
 Ascendancy
 Asmodée
 Bitter Rue
 Cadenza in Black
 Hamilton and Jones
 Here's Your Uncle George!
 John Donne
 Le Bourgeois Gentilhomme
 Lord Edward
 Lovers : Losers
 Patrick Sarsfield
 Pride and Prejudice
 Sea Change
 She Sits Smiling
 Sister Eucharia
 Tartufe
 The Absentee
 The Avenger
 The Barber of Seville
 The Earl of Straw
 The New Girl
 The Strange Lover
 The Uncrowned King
 The United Brothers
 Three Leopards
 Yahoo

References

Further reading

External links

1907 births
1997 deaths
20th-century Irish actresses
Irish film actresses
Irish television actresses
Irish stage actresses
Actresses from Dublin (city)